Mills Township is a civil township of Ogemaw County in the U.S. state of Michigan. The population was 4,291 at the 2010 census, making it the county's most populated municipality.

Communities
Skidway Lake contained its own summer post office from 1959–1962 and again from 1963–1999.

Geography

Demographics
As of the census of 2000, there were 4,005 people, 1,705 households, and 1,159 families residing in the township. The racial makeup of the township was 96.13% White, 0.27% African American, 1.52% Native American, 0.05% from other races, and 2.02% from two or more races. Hispanic or Latino of any race were 1.25% of the population.

There were 1,705 households, out of which 23.8% had children under the age of 18 living with them, 52.0% were married couples living together, 10.8% had a female householder with no husband present, and 32.0% were non-families. 26.4% of all households were made up of individuals, and 12.9% had someone living alone who was 65 years of age or older.  The average household size was 2.35 and the average family size was 2.79.

In the township the population was spread out, with 21.3% under the age of 18, 6.8% from 18 to 24, 23.8% from 25 to 44, 28.4% from 45 to 64, and 19.7% who were 65 years of age or older.  The median age was 44 years. For every 100 females, there were 102.5 males.  For every 100 females age 18 and over, there were 98.9 males.

The median income for a household in the township was $21,703, and the median income for a family was $26,050. Males had a median income of $26,223 versus $16,993 for females. The per capita income for the township was $12,355.  About 17.4% of families and 21.6% of the population were below the poverty line, including 26.7% of those under age 18 and 13.6% of those age 65 or over.

References

Townships in Ogemaw County, Michigan
Townships in Michigan